The Balkåkra Ritual Object is an item from the Bronze Age found in Balkåkra in Sweden in 1847. Its use and purpose remain unknown.

History
The object was found in a bog in Balkåkra socken close to Ystad in Scania, Sweden in 1847. It has been dated to  1500 – 1300 BC, i.e. early Nordic Bronze Age. A similar item was discovered in 1913 not far from Sopron in Hungary. It has been suggested that the object found in Balkåkra may have been imported from present-day Hungary and not produced locally.

Description
The item consists of a round frame made of bronze perforated with holes and carried by ten wheels. A flat and loose bronze plate placed on top of it. The plate is decorated with zig-zag patterns.

Interpretation
It is not known what purpose the item served, but it has been assumed that it had a ritual use. Suggestions have been made that it could have been a gong, a drum, a throne or a burning glass.

References

External links
Detailed photos from the Swedish History Museum on Flickr

Nordic Bronze Age
Archaeology of Sweden